V382 Carinae, also known as x Carinae (x Car), is a yellow hypergiant in the constellation Carina.  It is a G-type star with a mean apparent magnitude of +3.93, and a variable star of low amplitude.

Variability

The radial velocity of V382 Carinae has long been known to be variable, but variations in its brightness were unclear.  Brightness variations were detected by some observers, but others found it to be constant.  It was formally named as a variable star in 1981, listed in the General Catalogue of Variable Stars as a possible δ Cephei variable.  It has been described as a pseudo-Cepheid, a supergiant with pulsations similar to a Cepheid but less regular.

Analysis of Hipparcos photometry showed clear variation with a maximum range of 0.12 magnitudes and the star was treated as an α Cygni variable.  A period of 556 days was suggested, but it is not entirely consistent.  It is now generally treated as a semiregular or irregular supergiant.

Properties

V382 Car is the brightest yellow hypergiant in the night sky, easily visible to the naked eye and brighter than Rho Cassiopeiae although not visible from much of the northern hemisphere.  It is 6,200 light years from Earth and around 500 times the radius of the Sun. The large size means that V382 Car is over 200,000 times as luminous as the sun. The low infrared excess suggest that V382 Carinae may be cooling towards a red supergiant phase, less common than yellow hypergiants evolving towards hotter temperatures.

References

Carinae, x
Carina (constellation)
G-type hypergiants
Carinae, V382
096918
4337
Durchmusterung objects
Slow irregular variables
054463